UN pension is a retirement benefit provided by the United Nations Joint Staff Pension Fund (UNJSPF) under Article 28 of the Regulations, Rules and
Pension Adjustment System of the United Nations Joint Staff Pension Fund (UNJSPF Rules).

Eligibility 
A UN pension is payable to a participant whose age on separation is the normal retirement age or more and whose contributory service was five years or longer.

Taxation 
Unlike the UN salaries, the UN pension to former officials or to their survivors are not exempt from national income taxation. Applied tax rate depends exclusively on national legislation. Most of the countries tax the pension, but many grant exemptions for the lump sum pension payment. Countries which grant tax exemption for the UN pensions whether it is paid as a lump sum or as a monthly income are: Argentina, Austria, Bahrain, Chile, India, Kuwait, Malaysia, Malta, Singapore, Saudi Arabia, UAE, Uruguay  and Thailand. 
However, a different rule may apply to lump sum pension.

Colombia 
UN pension is subject to taxes if exceeds 1,000 uvt(s) a month, which is approximately US$10,000. (1 uvt equals 10 dollars).

India 
UN pension is not subject of income taxes in India, per decision of the Calcutta High Court.

Canada 
UN pensions in Canada are subject of the USA-Canada tax treaty under which pensions that arise in the USA are taxed in Canada on the same basis as they are taxed for US residents. However, there is a portion of the pension which is tax exempt. For those on disability pension, the benefits can be totally tax exempt in certain circumstances.

Cyprus 
Foreign pensions in Cyprus are taxed at a rate of 5% for amounts exceeding €3,420 annually.

Further reading
UNJSPF benefits

References

Pensions